Branden is a surname. Notable people with the surname include:

Barbara Branden (1929–2013), Canadian writer, editor and lecturer
Mikael Branden (born 1959), former Swedish backstroke swimmer
Nathaniel Branden (1930–2014), Canadian–American psychotherapist and writer

See also
Branden (given name)
Brandan, given name and surname
Brandon (surname)
Brandin, name
Braden (surname)